Zoltán Varga (born 2 March 1983, in Budapest) is a Hungarian football player who currently plays for Rákospalotai EAC.

References
profile

1983 births
Living people
Hungarian footballers
Ferencvárosi TC footballers
Győri ETO FC players
Kaposvári Rákóczi FC players
Pécsi MFC players
Rákospalotai EAC footballers
Debreceni VSC players
Association football midfielders
Footballers from Budapest